Colson John Smith (born 13 August 1998) is an English actor who is known for portraying the role of Craig Tinker on the ITV soap opera Coronation Street. In 2022, he competed on the ITV reality series The Games.

Life and career
Smith was born on 13 August 1998 in Dorchester, Dorset, and later moved to Castleford, West Yorkshire, where he attended Castleford High School. In 2009, Smith began attending acting classes run by Northern Film and Drama. In 2011, he was cast as Craig Tinker in the ITV soap opera Coronation Street, the son of Beth Tinker (Lisa George). His character's storylines have included a battle with OCD and becoming a police officer. For his role of Craig, he was nominated for Best Young Actor at the 2015 Inside Soap Awards. Outside of Coronation Street, Smith has appeared as Adam Concus in several short films, the first being Platform2C in 2011, followed by Hollows Wood and Jailhouse Dog in 2014. He also appeared as Jack in Reverie. In 2020, Smith took up running to lose weight and released his own YouTube documentary Bored of Being the Fat Kid. He also appeared on the Sofa Cinema Club podcast alongside his Coronation Street co-stars Ben Price and Jack P. Shepherd. In 2021, he appeared on a celebrity special of Sitting on a Fortune. In May 2022, he was a contestant on the sporting reality series The Games.

Filmography

Awards and nominations

References

External links
 

1998 births
English child actors
English male soap opera actors
Living people
Participants in British reality television series
People from Dorchester, Dorset
People from Castleford